This is a list of the bird species recorded in East Timor. The avifauna of East Timor include a total of 289 species.

This list's taxonomic treatment (designation and sequence of orders, families and species) and nomenclature (common and scientific names) follow the conventions of The Clements Checklist of the Birds of the World, 2022 edition. The family accounts at the beginning of each heading reflect this taxonomy, as do the species counts found in each family account. Introduced and accidental species are included in the total counts for East Timor.

The following tags have been used to highlight several categories, but not all species fall into one of these categories. Those that do not are commonly occurring native species.

 (A) Accidental - a species that rarely or accidentally occurs in East Timor
 (E) Endemic - a species endemic to East Timor
 (I) Introduced - a species introduced to East Timor as a consequence, direct or indirect, of human actions

Ducks, geese, and waterfowl
Order: AnseriformesFamily: Anatidae

Anatidae includes the ducks and most duck-like waterfowl, such as geese and swans. These birds are adapted to an aquatic existence with webbed feet, flattened bills, and feathers that are excellent at shedding water due to an oily coating.

Wandering whistling-duck, Dendrocygna arcuata
Radjah shelduck, Radjah radjah (A)
Green pygmy-goose, Nettapus pulchellus
Garganey, Spatula querquedula (A)
Pacific black duck, Anas superciliosa
Sunda teal, Anas gibberifrons
Gray teal, Anas gracilis
Hardhead, Aythya australis

Megapodes
Order: GalliformesFamily: Megapodiidae

The Megapodiidae are stocky, medium-large chicken-like birds with small heads and large feet. All but the malleefowl occupy jungle habitats and most have brown or black coloring.

Orange-footed scrubfowl, Megapodius reinwardt

Pheasants, grouse, and allies
Order: GalliformesFamily: Phasianidae

The Phasianidae are a family of terrestrial birds which consists of quails, partridges, snowcocks, francolins, spurfowls, tragopans, monals, pheasants, peafowls and jungle fowls. In general, they are plump (although they vary in size) and have broad, relatively short wings.

Red junglefowl, Gallus gallus
Brown quail, Synoicus ypsilophorus
Blue-breasted quail, Synoicus chinensis

Grebes
Order: PodicipediformesFamily: Podicipedidae

Grebes are small to medium-large freshwater diving birds. They have lobed toes and are excellent swimmers and divers. However, they have their feet placed far back on the body, making them quite ungainly on land.

Little grebe, Tachybaptus ruficollis
Australasian grebe, Tachybaptus novaehollandiae

Pigeons and doves
Order: ColumbiformesFamily: Columbidae

Pigeons and doves are stout-bodied birds with short necks and short slender bills with a fleshy cere.

Rock pigeon, Columba livia
Metallic pigeon, Columba vitiensis
Sunda collared-dove, Streptopelia bitorquata
Spotted dove, Streptopelia chinensis
Timor cuckoo-dove, Macropygia magna
Little cuckoo-dove, Macropygia ruficeps
Slaty cuckoo-dove, Turacoena modesta
Asian emerald dove, Chalcophaps indica
Pacific emerald dove, Chalcophaps longirostris
Wetar ground dove, Alopecoenas hoedtii
Barred dove, Geopelia maugeus
Timor green-pigeon, Treron psittaceus
Black-backed fruit-dove, Ptilinopus cinctus
Rose-crowned fruit-dove, Ptilinopus regina 
Pink-headed imperial-pigeon, Ducula rosacea
Timor imperial-pigeon, Ducula cineracea
Pied imperial-pigeon, Ducula bicolor (A)

Cuckoos
Order: CuculiformesFamily: Cuculidae

The family Cuculidae includes cuckoos, roadrunners and anis. These birds are of variable size with slender bodies, long tails and strong legs. The Old World cuckoos are brood parasites.

Lesser coucal, Centropus bengalensis
Pheasant coucal, Centropus phasianinus
Pacific koel, Eudynamys orientalis
Channel-billed cuckoo, Scythrops novaehollandiae
Horsfield's bronze-cuckoo, Chrysococcyx basalis
Shining bronze-cuckoo, Chrysococcyx lucidus
Little bronze-cuckoo, Chrysococcyx minutillus
Pallid cuckoo, Cacomantis pallidus
Brush cuckoo, Cacomantis variolosus
Himalayan cuckoo, Cuculus saturatus
Sunda cuckoo, Cuculus lepidus
Oriental cuckoo, Cuculus optatus

Nightjars and allies
Order: CaprimulgiformesFamily: Caprimulgidae

Nightjars are medium-sized nocturnal birds that usually nest on the ground. They have long wings, short legs and very short bills. Most have small feet, of little use for walking, and long pointed wings. Their soft plumage is camouflaged to resemble bark or leaves.

Large-tailed nightjar, Caprimulgus macrurus
Savanna nightjar, Caprimulgus affinis

Swifts
Order: CaprimulgiformesFamily: Apodidae

Swifts are small birds which spend the majority of their lives flying. These birds have very short legs and never settle voluntarily on the ground, perching instead only on vertical surfaces. Many swifts have long swept-back wings which resemble a crescent or boomerang.

White-throated needletail, Hirundapus caudacutus
Drab swiftlet, Collocalia neglecta
White-nest swiftlet, Aerodramus fuciphagus
Pacific swift, Apus pacificus
House swift, Apus nipalensis

Rails, gallinules, and coots
Order: GruiformesFamily: Rallidae

Rallidae is a large family of small to medium-sized birds which includes the rails, crakes, coots and gallinules. Typically they inhabit dense vegetation in damp environments near lakes, swamps or rivers. In general they are shy and secretive birds, making them difficult to observe. Most species have strong legs and long toes which are well adapted to soft uneven surfaces. They tend to have short, rounded wings and to be weak fliers.

Slaty-breasted rail, Lewinia striata
Buff-banded rail, Gallirallus philippensis
Eurasian moorhen, Gallinula chloropus (A)
Dusky moorhen, Gallinula tenebrosa
Eurasian coot, Fulica atra
Black-backed swamphen, Porphyrio indicus
Australasian swamphen, Porphyrio melanotus (A)
White-browed crake, Poliolimnas cinereus
White-breasted waterhen, Amaurornis phoenicurus
Ruddy-breasted crake, Zapornia fusca
Baillon's crake, Zapornia pusilla (A)
Spotless crake, Zapornia tabuensis

Thick-knees
Order: CharadriiformesFamily: Burhinidae

The thick-knees are a group of largely tropical waders in the family Burhinidae. They are found worldwide within the tropical zone, with some species also breeding in temperate Europe and Australia. They are medium to large waders with strong black or yellow-black bills, large yellow eyes and cryptic plumage. Despite being classed as waders, most species have a preference for arid or semi-arid habitats.

Beach thick-knee, Esacus magnirostris

Stilts and avocets
Order: CharadriiformesFamily: Recurvirostridae

Recurvirostridae is a family of large wading birds, which includes the avocets and stilts. The avocets have long legs and long up-curved bills. The stilts have extremely long legs and long, thin, straight bills.

Pied stilt, Himantopus leucocephalus

Plovers and lapwings
Order: CharadriiformesFamily: Charadriidae

The family Charadriidae includes the plovers, dotterels and lapwings. They are small to medium-sized birds with compact bodies, short, thick necks and long, usually pointed, wings. They are found in open country worldwide, mostly in habitats near water.

Black-bellied plover, Pluvialis squatarola
Pacific golden-plover, Pluvialis fulva
Masked lapwing, Vanellus miles (A)
Lesser sand-plover, Charadrius mongolus
Greater sand-plover, Charadrius leschenaultii
Red-capped plover, Charadrius ruficapillus
Malaysian plover, Charadrius peronii
Kentish plover, Charadrius alexandrinus (A)
Javan plover, Charadrius javanicus (A)
Little ringed plover, Charadrius dubius
Oriental plover, Charadrius veredus

Painted-snipes
Order: CharadriiformesFamily: Rostratulidae

Painted-snipes are short-legged, long-billed birds similar in shape to the true snipes, but more brightly colored.

Greater painted-snipe, Rostratula benghalensis (A)

Jacanas
Order: CharadriiformesFamily: Jacanidae

The jacanas are a group of tropical waders in the family Jacanidae. They are found throughout the tropics. They are identifiable by their huge feet and claws which enable them to walk on floating vegetation in the shallow lakes that are their preferred habitat.

Comb-crested jacana, Irediparra gallinacea

Sandpipers and allies
Order: CharadriiformesFamily: Scolopacidae

Scolopacidae is a large diverse family of small to medium-sized shorebirds including the sandpipers, curlews, godwits, shanks, tattlers, woodcocks, snipes, dowitchers and phalaropes. The majority of these species eat small invertebrates picked out of the mud or soil. Variation in length of legs and bills enables multiple species to feed in the same habitat, particularly on the coast, without direct competition for food.

Whimbrel, Numenius phaeopus
Little curlew, Numenius minutus
Far Eastern curlew, Numenius madagascariensis
Eurasian curlew, Numenius arquata (A)
Bar-tailed godwit, Limosa lapponica
Black-tailed godwit, Limosa limosa
Ruddy turnstone, Arenaria interpres
Great knot, Calidris tenuirostris
Red knot, Calidris canutus (A)
Ruff, Calidris pugnax
Broad-billed sandpiper, Calidris falcinellus
Sharp-tailed sandpiper, Calidris acuminata
Curlew sandpiper, Calidris ferruginea
Long-toed stint, Calidris subminuta
Red-necked stint, Calidris ruficollis
Sanderling, Calidris alba
Pectoral sandpiper, Calidris melanotos (A)
Asian dowitcher, Limnodromus semipalmatus (A)
Common snipe, Gallinago gallinago
Pin-tailed snipe, Gallinago stenura
Swinhoe's snipe, Gallinago megala
Terek sandpiper, Xenus cinereus
Red-necked phalarope, Phalaropus lobatus
Common sandpiper, Actitis hypoleucos
Gray-tailed tattler, Tringa brevipes
Spotted redshank, Tringa erythropus (A) 
Common greenshank, Tringa nebularia
Marsh sandpiper, Tringa stagnatilis
Wood sandpiper, Tringa glareola
Common redshank, Tringa totanus

Buttonquail
Order: CharadriiformesFamily: Turnicidae

The buttonquail are small, drab, running birds which resemble the true quails. The female is the brighter of the sexes and initiates courtship. The male incubates the eggs and tends the young.

Red-backed buttonquail, Turnix maculosus

Pratincoles and coursers
Order: CharadriiformesFamily: Glareolidae

Glareolidae is a family of wading birds comprising the pratincoles, which have short legs, long pointed wings and long forked tails, and the coursers, which have long legs, short wings and long, pointed bills which curve downwards.

Australian pratincole, Stiltia isabella
Oriental pratincole, Glareola maldivarum

Skuas and jaegers
Order: CharadriiformesFamily: Stercorariidae

The family Stercorariidae are, in general, medium to large birds, typically with gray or brown plumage, often with white markings on the wings. They nest on the ground in temperate and arctic regions and are long-distance migrants.

South Polar skua, Stercorarius maccormicki (A)
Pomarine jaeger, Stercorarius pomarinus
Parasitic jaeger, Stercorarius parasiticus (A)

Gulls, terns, and skimmers
Order: CharadriiformesFamily: Laridae

Laridae is a family of medium to large seabirds, the gulls, terns, and skimmers. Gulls are typically gray or white, often with black markings on the head or wings. They have stout, longish bills and webbed feet. Terns are a group of generally medium to large seabirds typically with gray or white plumage, often with black markings on the head. Most terns hunt fish by diving but some pick insects off the surface of fresh water. Terns are generally long-lived birds, with several species known to live in excess of 30 years.

Black-headed gull, Chroicocephalus ridibundus (A)
Brown noddy, Anous stolidus
Sooty tern, Onychoprion fuscatus
Bridled tern, Onychoprion anaethetus
Little tern, Sternula albifrons
Gull-billed tern, Gelochelidon nilotica
Caspian tern, Hydroprogne caspia 
White-winged tern, Chlidonias leucopterus
Whiskered tern, Chlidonias hybrida
Black-naped tern, Sterna sumatrana
Common tern, Sterna hirundo
Great crested tern, Thalasseus bergii
Lesser crested tern, Thalasseus bengalensis

Tropicbirds
Order: PhaethontiformesFamily: Phaethontidae

Tropicbirds are slender white birds of tropical oceans, with exceptionally long central tail feathers. Their long wings have black markings, as does the head.

 White-tailed tropicbird, Phaethon lepturus (A)
 Red-tailed tropicbird, Phaethon rubricauda

Southern storm-petrels
Order: ProcellariiformesFamily: Oceanitidae

The southern storm-petrels are the smallest seabirds, relatives of the petrels, feeding on planktonic crustaceans and small fish picked from the surface, typically while hovering. The flight is fluttering and sometimes bat-like.

White-faced storm-petrel, Pelagodroma marina (A)

Northern storm-petrels
Order: ProcellariiformesFamily: Hydrobatidae

Though the members of this family are similar in many respects to the southern storm-petrels, including their general appearance and habits, there are enough genetic differences to warrant their placement in a separate family.

Matsudaira's storm-petrel, Hydrobates matsudairae

Shearwaters and petrels
Order: ProcellariiformesFamily: Procellariidae

The procellariids are the main group of medium-sized "true petrels", characterized by united nostrils with medium septum and a long outer functional primary.

Cape petrel, Daption capense (A)
Bulwer's petrel, Bulweria bulwerii
Streaked shearwater, Calonectris leucomelas
Wedge-tailed shearwater, Ardenna pacificus

Frigatebirds
Order: SuliformesFamily: Fregatidae

Frigatebirds are large seabirds usually found over tropical oceans. They are large, black-and-white or completely black, with long wings and deeply forked tails. The males have colored inflatable throat pouches. They do not swim or walk and cannot take off from a flat surface. Having the largest wingspan-to-body-weight ratio of any bird, they are essentially aerial, able to stay aloft for more than a week.

Lesser frigatebird, Fregata ariel
Christmas Island frigatebird, Fregata andrewsi  (A)
Great frigatebird, Fregata minor

Boobies and gannets
Order: SuliformesFamily: Sulidae

The sulids comprise the gannets and boobies. Both groups are medium to large coastal seabirds that plunge-dive for fish.

Masked booby, Sula dactylatra
Brown booby, Sula leucogaster
Red-footed booby, Sula sula

Anhingas
Order: SuliformesFamily: Anhingidae

Anhingas or darters are often called "snake-birds" because of their long thin neck, which gives a snake-like appearance when they swim with their bodies submerged. The males have black and dark-brown plumage, an erectile crest on the nape and a larger bill than the female. The females have much paler plumage especially on the neck and underparts. The darters have completely webbed feet and their legs are short and set far back on the body. Their plumage is somewhat permeable, like that of cormorants, and they spread their wings to dry after diving.

Australasian darter, Anhinga novaehollandiae

Cormorants and shags
Order: SuliformesFamily: Phalacrocoracidae

Phalacrocoracidae is a family of medium to large coastal, fish-eating seabirds that includes cormorants and shags. Plumage coloration varies, with the majority having mainly dark plumage, some species being black-and-white and a few being colorful.

Little pied cormorant, Microcarbo melanoleucos
Little black cormorant, Phalacrocorax sulcirostris

Pelicans
Order: PelecaniformesFamily: Pelecanidae

Pelicans are large water birds with distinctive pouches under their bills. Like other birds in the order Pelecaniformes, they have four webbed toes.

Australian pelican, Pelecanus conspicillatus

Herons, egrets, and bitterns
Order: PelecaniformesFamily: Ardeidae

The family Ardeidae contains the bitterns, herons, and egrets. Herons and egrets are medium to large wading birds with long necks and legs. Bitterns tend to be shorter necked and more wary. Members of Ardeidae fly with their necks retracted, unlike other long-necked birds such as storks, ibises and spoonbills.

Yellow bittern, Ixobrychus sinensis
Schrenck's bittern, Ixobrychus eurhythmus (A)
Cinnamon bittern, Ixobrychus cinnamomeus
Black bittern, Ixobrychus flavicollis
Great-billed heron, Ardea sumatrana
Purple heron, Ardea purpurea
Great egret, Ardea alba 
Intermediate egret, Ardea intermedia
White-faced heron, Egretta novaehollandiae
Little egret, Egretta garzetta
Pacific reef-heron, Egretta sacra
Pied heron, Egretta picata
Cattle egret, Bubulcus ibis
Javan pond-heron, Ardeola speciosa
Striated heron, Butorides striata
Black-crowned night-heron, Nycticorax nycticorax
Nankeen night-heron, Nycticorax caledonicus

Ibises and spoonbills
Order: PelecaniformesFamily: Threskiornithidae

Threskiornithidae is a family of large terrestrial and wading birds which includes the ibises and spoonbills. They have long, broad wings with 11 primary and about 20 secondary feathers. They are strong fliers and despite their size and weight, very capable soarers.

Glossy ibis, Plegadis falcinellus
Australian ibis, Threskiornis moluccus (A)
Royal spoonbill, Platalea regia

Osprey
Order: AccipitriformesFamily: Pandionidae

The family Pandionidae contains only one species, the osprey. The osprey is a medium-large raptor which is a specialist fish-eater with a worldwide distribution.

Osprey, Pandion haliaetus

Hawks, eagles, and kites
Order: AccipitriformesFamily: Accipitridae

Accipitridae is a family of birds of prey, which includes hawks, eagles, kites, harriers, and Old World vultures. These birds have powerful hooked beaks for tearing flesh from their prey, strong legs, powerful talons and keen eyesight.

Black-winged kite, Elanus caeruleus
Oriental honey-buzzard, Pernis ptilorhynchus
Pacific baza, Aviceda subcristata
Short-toed snake-eagle, Circaetus gallicus
Bonelli's eagle, Aquila fasciata
Gray-faced buzzard, Butastur indicus
Spotted harrier, Circus assimilis (A)
Chinese sparrowhawk, Accipiter soloensis
Brown goshawk, Accipiter fasciatus
Japanese sparrowhawk, Accipiter gularis
Besra, Accipiter virgatus
Black kite, Milvus migrans
Brahminy kite, Haliastur indus
White-bellied sea-eagle, Haliaeetus leucogaster

Barn-owls
Order: StrigiformesFamily: Tytonidae

Barn-owls are medium to large owls with large heads and characteristic heart-shaped faces. They have long strong legs with powerful talons.

Barn owl, Tyto alba

Owls
Order: StrigiformesFamily: Strigidae

The typical owls are small to large solitary nocturnal birds of prey. They have large forward-facing eyes and ears, a hawk-like beak and a conspicuous circle of feathers around each eye called a facial disk.

Southern boobook, Ninox boobook
Timor boobook, Ninox fusca
Brown boobook, Ninox scutulata

Kingfishers
Order: CoraciiformesFamily: Alcedinidae

Kingfishers are medium-sized birds with large heads, long pointed bills, short legs, and stubby tails.

Common kingfisher, Alcedo atthis
Sacred kingfisher, Todirhamphus sanctus
Collared kingfisher, Todirhamphus chloris
Cinnamon-banded kingfisher, Todirhamphus australasia

Bee-eaters
Order: CoraciiformesFamily: Meropidae

The bee-eaters are a group of near passerine birds in the family Meropidae. Most species are found in Africa but others occur in southern Europe, Madagascar, Australia and New Guinea. They are characterized by richly colored plumage, slender bodies and usually elongated central tail feathers. All are colorful and have long downturned bills and pointed wings, which give them a swallow-like appearance when seen from afar.

Blue-tailed bee-eater, Merops philippinus
Rainbow bee-eater, Merops ornatus

Rollers
Order: CoraciiformesFamily: Coraciidae

Rollers resemble crows in size and build, but are more closely related to the kingfishers and bee-eaters. They share the colorful appearance of those groups with blues and browns predominating. The two inner front toes are connected, but the outer toe is not.

Dollarbird, Eurystomus orientalis

Falcons and caracaras
Order: FalconiformesFamily: Falconidae

Falconidae is a family of diurnal birds of prey. They differ from hawks, eagles and kites in that they kill with their beaks instead of their talons.

Spotted kestrel, Falco moluccensis
Nankeen kestrel, Falco cenchroides
Eurasian hobby, Falco subbuteo (A)
Australian hobby, Falco longipennis
Peregrine falcon, Falco peregrinus

Cockatoos
Order: PsittaciformesFamily: Cacatuidae

The cockatoos share many features with other parrots including the characteristic curved beak shape and a zygodactyl foot, with two forward toes and two backwards toes. They differ, however in a number of characteristics, including the often spectacular movable headcrest.

Yellow-crested cockatoo, Cacatua sulphurea

Old World parrots
Order: PsittaciformesFamily: Psittaculidae

Characteristic features of parrots include a strong curved bill, an upright stance, strong legs, and clawed zygodactyl feet. Many parrots are vividly coloured, and some are multi-coloured. Old World parrots are found from Africa east across south and southeast Asia and Oceania to Australia and New Zealand.

Olive-shouldered parrot, Aprosmictus jonquillaceus
Red-cheeked parrot, Geoffroyus geoffroyi
Great-billed parrot, Tanygnathus megalorynchos
Iris lorikeet, Saudareos iris
Blue-streaked lory, Eos reticulata (A)
Olive-headed lorikeet, Trichoglossus euteles
Marigold lorikeet, Trichoglossus capistratus

Pittas
Order: PasseriformesFamily: Pittidae

Pittas are medium-sized by passerine standards and are stocky, with fairly long, strong legs, short tails and stout bills. Many are brightly colored. They spend the majority of their time on wet forest floors, eating snails, insects and similar invertebrates.

Elegant pitta, Pitta elegans

Honeyeaters
Order: PasseriformesFamily: Meliphagidae

The honeyeaters are a large and diverse family of small to medium-sized birds most common in Australia, New Guinea and Indonesia. They are nectar feeders and closely resemble other nectar-feeding passerines.

Streak-breasted honeyeater, Territornis reticulata
Black-breasted myzomela, Myzomela vulnerata
Indonesian honeyeater, Lichmera limbata
Yellow-eared honeyeater, Lichmera flavicans
Timor friarbird, Philemon inornatus
Helmeted friarbird, Philemon buceroides

Thornbills and allies
Order: PasseriformesFamily: Acanthizidae

Thornbills are small passerine birds, similar in habits to the tits.

Plain gerygone, Gerygone inornata

Cuckooshrikes
Order: PasseriformesFamily: Campephagidae

The cuckooshrikes are small to medium-sized passerine birds. They are predominantly grayish with white and black, although some species are brightly colored.

Black-faced cuckooshrike, Coracina novaehollandiae
Wallacean cuckooshrike, Coracina personata
White-shouldered triller, Lalage sueurii
Common cicadabird,  Edolisoma tenuirostre

Whistlers and allies
Order: PasseriformesFamily: Pachycephalidae

The family Pachycephalidae includes the whistlers, shrikethrushes, and some of the pitohuis.

Fawn-breasted whistler, Pachycephala orpheus
Yellow-throated whistler, Pachycephala macrorhyncha
Baliem whistler, Pachycephala balim

Old World orioles
Order: PasseriformesFamily: Oriolidae

The Old World orioles are colorful passerine birds. They are not related to the New World orioles.

Timor oriole, Oriolus melanotis
Green figbird, Sphecotheres viridis

Woodswallows, bellmagpies, and allies
Order: PasseriformesFamily: Artamidae

The woodswallows are soft-plumaged, somber-colored passerine birds. They are smooth, agile flyers with moderately large, semi-triangular wings.

White-breasted woodswallow, Artamus leucorynchus
Black-faced woodswallow, Artamus cinereus

Fantails
Order: PasseriformesFamily: Rhipiduridae

The fantails are small insectivorous birds which are specialist aerial feeders.

Northern fantail, Rhipidura rufiventris
Arafura fantail, Rhipidura dryas

Drongos
Order: PasseriformesFamily: Dicruridae

The drongos are mostly black or dark gray in color, sometimes with metallic tints. They have long forked tails, and some Asian species have elaborate tail decorations. They have short legs and sit very upright when perched, like a shrike. They flycatch or take prey from the ground.

Wallacean drongo, Dicrurus densus

Monarch flycatchers
Order: PasseriformesFamily: Monarchidae

The monarch flycatchers are small to medium-sized insectivorous passerines which hunt by flycatching.

Island monarch, Monarcha cinerascens
Spectacled monarch, Symposiachrus trivirgatus
Magpie-lark, Grallina cyanoleuca  (A)
Broad-billed flycatcher, Myiagra ruficollis

Shrikes
Order: PasseriformesFamily: Laniidae

Shrikes are passerine birds known for their habit of catching other birds and small animals and impaling the uneaten portions of their bodies on thorns. A typical shrike's beak is hooked, like a bird of prey.

Long-tailed shrike, Lanius schach

Crows, jays, and magpies
Order: PasseriformesFamily: Corvidae

The family Corvidae includes crows, ravens, jays, choughs, magpies, treepies, nutcrackers and ground jays. Corvids are above average in size among the Passeriformes, and some of the larger species show high levels of intelligence.

Large-billed crow, Corvus macrorhynchos

Tits, chickadees, and titmice
Order: PasseriformesFamily: Paridae

The Paridae are mainly small stocky woodland species with short stout bills. Some have crests. They are adaptable birds, with a mixed diet including seeds and insects.

Cinereous tit, Parus cinereus

Larks
Order: PasseriformesFamily: Alaudidae

Larks are small terrestrial birds with often extravagant songs and display flights. Most larks are fairly dull in appearance. Their food is insects and seeds.

Horsfield’s bushlark, Mirafra javanica

Cisticolas and allies
Order: PasseriformesFamily: Cisticolidae

The Cisticolidae are warblers found mainly in warmer southern regions of the Old World. They are generally very small birds of drab brown or gray appearance found in open country such as grassland or scrub.

Zitting cisticola, Cisticola juncidis
Golden-headed cisticola, Cisticola exilis

Reed warblers and allies
Order: PasseriformesFamily: Acrocephalidae

The members of this family are usually rather large for "warblers". Most are rather plain olivaceous brown above with much yellow to beige below. They are usually found in open woodland, reedbeds, or tall grass. The family occurs mostly in southern to western Eurasia and surroundings, but it also ranges far into the Pacific, with some species in Africa.

Oriental reed warbler, Acrocephalus orientalis
Australian reed warbler, Acrocephalus australis

Grassbirds and allies
Order: PasseriformesFamily: Locustellidae

Locustellidae are a family of small insectivorous songbirds found mainly in Eurasia, Africa, and the Australian region. They are smallish birds with tails that are usually long and pointed, and tend to be drab brownish or buffy all over.

Javan bush warbler, Locustella montis
Buff-banded bushbird, Cincloramphus bivittatus
Tawny grassbird, Cincloramphus timoriensis

Cupwings
Order: PasseriformesFamily: Pnoepygidae

The members of this small family are found in mountainous parts of South and South East Asia.

Pygmy cupwing, Pnoepyga pusilla

Swallows
Order: PasseriformesFamily: Hirundinidae

The family Hirundinidae is adapted to aerial feeding. They have a slender streamlined body, long pointed wings and a short bill with a wide gape. The feet are adapted to perching rather than walking, and the front toes are partially joined at the base.

Barn swallow, Hirundo rustica
Pacific swallow, Hirundo tahitica
Striated swallow, Cecropis striolata
Fairy martin, Petrochelidon ariel
Tree martin, Petrochelidon nigricans

Bulbuls
Order: PasseriformesFamily: Pycnonotidae

Bulbuls are medium-sized songbirds. Some are colorful with yellow, red or orange vents, cheeks, throats or supercilia, but most are drab, with uniform olive-brown to black plumage. Some species have distinct crests.

Sooty-headed bulbul, Pycnonotus aurigaster (I)
Yellow-vented bulbul, Pycnonotus goiavier (I)

Leaf warblers
Order: PasseriformesFamily: Phylloscopidae

Leaf warblers are a family of small insectivorous birds found mostly in Eurasia and ranging into Wallacea and Africa. The species are of various sizes, often green-plumaged above and yellow below, or more subdued with greyish-green to greyish-brown colors.

Japanese leaf warbler, Phylloscopus xanthodryas
Arctic warbler, Phylloscopus borealis
Kamchatka leaf warbler, Phylloscopus examinandus
Yellow-breasted warbler, Phylloscopus montis
Timor leaf warbler, Phylloscopus presbytes

Bush warblers and allies
Order: PasseriformesFamily: Scotocercidae

The members of this family are found throughout Africa, Asia, and Polynesia. Their taxonomy is in flux, and some authorities place some genera in other families.

Timor stubtail, Urosphena subulata
Aberrant bush warbler, Horornis flavolivaceus

White-eyes, yuhinas, and allies
Order: PasseriformesFamily: Zosteropidae

The white-eyes are small and mostly undistinguished, their plumage above being generally some dull color like greenish-olive, but some species have a white or bright yellow throat, breast or lower parts, and several have buff flanks. As their name suggests, many species have a white ring around each eye.

Timor white-eye, Heleia muelleri
Warbling white-eye, Zosterops japonicus
Ashy-bellied white-eye, Zosterops citrinella

Starlings
Order: PasseriformesFamily: Sturnidae

Starlings are small to medium-sized passerine birds. Their flight is strong and direct and they are very gregarious. Their preferred habitat is fairly open country. They eat insects and fruit. Plumage is typically dark with a metallic sheen.

Short-tailed starling, Aplonis minor
Pale-bellied myna, Acridotheres cinereus (I)

Thrushes and allies
Order: PasseriformesFamily: Turdidae

The thrushes are a group of passerine birds that occur mainly in the Old World. They are plump, soft plumaged, small to medium-sized insectivores or sometimes omnivores, often feeding on the ground. Many have attractive songs.

Sunda thrush, Zoothera andromedae
Chestnut-backed thrush, Geokichla dohertyi
Orange-banded thrush, Geokichla peronii
Island thrush, Turdus poliocephalus

Old World flycatchers
Order: PasseriformesFamily: Muscicapidae

Old World flycatchers are a large group of small passerine birds native to the Old World. They are mainly small arboreal insectivores. The appearance of these birds is highly varied, but they mostly have weak songs and harsh calls.

Timor blue flycatcher, Cyornis hyacinthinus
Lesser shortwing, Brachypteryx leucophris
Snowy-browed flycatcher, Ficedula hyperythra
Little pied flycatcher, Ficedula westermanni
Black-banded flycatcher, Ficedula timorensis
Pied bushchat, Saxicola caprata
Timor bushchat, Saxicola gutturalis

Flowerpeckers
Order: PasseriformesFamily: Dicaeidae

The flowerpeckers are very small, stout, often brightly colored birds, with short tails, short thick curved bills and tubular tongues.

Thick-billed flowerpecker, Dicaeum agile
Red-chested flowerpecker, Dicaeum maugei
Blood-breasted flowerpecker, Dicaeum sanguinolentum

Sunbirds and spiderhunters
Order: PasseriformesFamily: Nectariniidae

The sunbirds and spiderhunters are very small passerine birds which feed largely on nectar, although they will also take insects, especially when feeding young. Flight is fast and direct on their short wings. Most species can take nectar by hovering like a hummingbird, but usually perch to feed.

Flame-breasted sunbird, Cinnyris solaris

Waxbills and allies
Order: PasseriformesFamily: Estrildidae

The estrildid finches are small passerine birds of the Old World tropics and Australasia. They are gregarious and often colonial seed eaters with short thick but pointed bills. They are all similar in structure and habits, but have wide variation in plumage colors and patterns.

Zebra finch, Taeniopygia guttata
Timor sparrow, Padda fuscata
Scaly-breasted munia, Lonchura punctulata
Black-faced munia, Lonchura molucca
Pale-headed munia, Lonchura pallida
Five-colored munia, Lonchura quinticolor
Tricolored parrotfinch, Erythrura tricolor
Red avadavat, Amandava amandava

Old World sparrows
Order: PasseriformesFamily: Passeridae

Old World sparrows are small passerine birds. In general, sparrows tend to be small, plump, brown or gray birds with short tails and short powerful beaks. Sparrows are seed eaters, but they also consume small insects.

Eurasian tree sparrow, Passer montanus (I)

Wagtails and pipits
Order: PasseriformesFamily: Motacillidae

Motacillidae is a family of small passerine birds with medium to long tails. They include the wagtails, longclaws and pipits. They are slender, ground feeding insectivores of open country.

Gray wagtail, Motacilla cinerea
Western yellow wagtail, Motacilla flava
Eastern yellow wagtail, Motacilla tschutschensis
Paddyfield pipit, Anthus rufulus
Pechora pipit, Anthus gustavi

See also
List of birds
Lists of birds by region

References
Sources

Citations

'
'
East Timor